Fulco may refer to:

Fulco of Ireland ( 8th/9th century), Irish soldier and saint
Fulco of Basacers ( 1120), Norman nobleman
Fulco I, Margrave of Milan (died 1128)
Fulco (bishop of Estonia) ( 1165)
Fulco Luigi Ruffo-Scilla (1840–1895), Italian cardinal
Fulco Ruffo di Calabria (1884–1946), Italian aviator and politician
Fulco di Verdura (1898–1978), Italian jeweller
Fabio Fulco (born 1970), Italian actor
Giovanni Fulco (died  1680), Italian baroque painter
William Fulco (born 1936), American Jesuit priest
Bettina Fulco (born 1968), Argentine tennis player

See also
Fulk, a given name
Falco (disambiguation)